Olu Irame was the 3rd Olu of Warri. He was the second son to Olu Ginuwa and succeeded his brother Olu Ogbowuru (Ijijen) as the 3rd Olu of Warri. It is stated that he banished the three gods (Ibirikimo, Otueke, and Ike) and their worshipers from Ode-Itsekiri-Olu (Big Warri) because of their incessant ''noise-making". The gods and their worshipers moved to Orugbo which is a community about 2 miles from Ode-Itsekiri-olu.

References

Nigerian traditional rulers
People from Warri